Papilio ornythion, the ornythion swallowtail, is a swallowtail butterfly of the subfamily Papilioninae. It is found in Mexico and Guatemala. It is occasionally recorded from central and southern Texas and New Mexico and rarely from southern Arizona and Kansas.

Adults are on wing from April to September. There are probably two generations per year.

The larvae feed on the leaves of Citrus trees. Adults feed on flower nectar.

External links

ornythion
Butterflies of North America
Papilionidae of South America
Butterflies described in 1836
Taxa named by Jean Baptiste Boisduval